Albert Costa Balboa (born 2 May 1990 in Barcelona) is a Spanish racing driver who currently competes in the FIA World Endurance Championship for Inter Europol Competition.

Career

Karting
Costa started his international karting career in 2004, in the Copa Campeones Trophy for ICA Junior class karts, finishing in seventh position. He continued in the same class in 2005, with the exception of the Copa Campeones Trophy, where he competed in the ICA class. He finished seventh again in that race, adding a seventh in the Spanish ICA Junior Championship, a 27th in the Andrea Margutti Trophy, and 29th in the European Championship. However, Costa excelled himself later in the season, winning the Italian Open Masters. He held off the challenges of Charles Pic and Marcus Ericsson to win the title by nine points. He continued in karting in 2006, but moved into the ICA class full-time. He competed in five different championships over the course of the season, but only finished in the top fifteen in the Asian-Pacific Championship.

Formula Three
Costa made the substantial leap from karting to Formula Three, missing out many conventional lower single-seater formulae. He drove for Räikkönen Robertson Racing in the first five rounds of the series, before funds dried up. His best result came during the series' first visit to the Bucharest Ring in Romania, when he finished fourth in class, just over a second behind Hamad Al Fardan who finished third.

Formula Renault
After his Formula Three career was cut short by lack of funds, Costa dropped down to Formula Renault to compete in the Eurocup and West European Cup for Epsilon Euskadi. Costa finished eighth in the pan-European series, despite failing to finish on the podium in any of the fourteen races. His best finish was fourth at the Nürburgring and Le Mans. He also recorded the fastest lap during the first race at Estoril. He placed three spots higher in the WEC, finishing fifth overall and runner-up in the rookie standings behind Jean-Éric Vergne.

Costa continued with Epsilon into 2009, again competing in the Eurocup and West European Cup. He won the Eurocup, holding off the challenges of both Vergne and António Félix da Costa, and two weeks later, sealed the WEC title thanks to a double win at the Autódromo Internacional do Algarve. Costa won thirteen of the 28 races he competed in, winning five in the Eurocup and eight in the WEC.

Formula Renault 3.5 Series

After being awarded €500,000 prize money for winning the Eurocup title, Costa graduated to the Formula Renault 3.5 Series in 2010 with Epsilon Euskadi.

Eurocup Megane Trophy
Costa will remain part of the World Series by Renault in 2012 as he switches to Eurocup Megane Trophy with defending champions Oregon. The Spaniard had hoped to remain on the single-seater ladder but a budget shortfall necessitated his switch to tin-tops. Costa won the title at his first attempt, scoring seven race victories along the way.

Racing record

Career summary

Complete Formula Renault 3.5 Series results
(key) (Races in bold indicate pole position) (Races in italics indicate fastest lap)

Complete FIA World Endurance Championship results

References

External links

 Career statistics from Driver Database

1990 births
Living people
Spanish racing drivers
Formula Renault Eurocup drivers
Formula Renault 2.0 WEC drivers
Racing drivers from Barcelona
World Series Formula V8 3.5 drivers
FIA Institute Young Driver Excellence Academy drivers
Eurocup Mégane Trophy drivers
International GT Open drivers
24 Hours of Daytona drivers
British Formula Three Championship drivers
Blancpain Endurance Series drivers
WeatherTech SportsCar Championship drivers
ADAC GT Masters drivers
Stock Car Brasil drivers
Double R Racing drivers
Epsilon Euskadi drivers
Emil Frey Racing drivers
20th-century Spanish people
21st-century Spanish people
Jaguar Racing drivers
EPIC Racing drivers
Lamborghini Squadra Corse drivers
FIA World Endurance Championship drivers